The 2009–2010 flu pandemic in Norway marked the initial phase of a new influenza pandemic. This pandemic began in the spring of 2009, the illness appeared in tourists returning from affected areas. By the summer of 2009, local person-to-person transmission within Norway was established. Soon thereafter, the number of patients being tested for swine flu exceeded capacity, and authorities recommended that only patients with severe symptoms be tested. The first Norwegian death from swine flu was reported in early September 2009.

Norway was notable among the Scandinavian countries for a high number of swine flu deaths—29 deaths as of January 4, 2010. All 19 counties of Norway had confirmed cases, and deaths occurred in five of the counties. Only Svalbard (an archipelago midway between Norway and the North Pole) had no reported cases of swine flu. About 10 million doses of flu vaccine were ordered from the pharmaceutical industry when the World Health Organization declared a pandemic. The first vaccination campaign started in Bergen, on October 22, 2009, with several hundred people queuing up. The flu was given widespread media coverage and the Norwegian government published a tally of laboratory-confirmed cases of swine flu, but made clear that this was an underestimation.

Timeline overview 
On April 25, 2009, the Norwegian Institute for Public Health increased their level of alert after reports of a severe influenza in Mexico. Three days later, it was considered "highly likely" that the new flu would reach Norway within the next few weeks. The first confirmed Norwegian cases appeared on May 9, 2009, in tourists returning from affected areas. By the summer of 2009, local spread of the influenza was established.

On May 9, 2009, the first confirmed cases were reported in two students from Oslo and Telemark returning from trips abroad. As of early July 2009, there were 42 confirmed cases of swine flu, of which 39 of the people were infected while abroad. In late July 2009, a local outbreak was reported in a summer camp in Western Norway. The number of patients wanting tests for the suspected new flu soon exceeded the capacity to test, and by late July 2009, Norwegian authorities were recommending that only severe and special cases be tested.

Influenza surveillance 
The Norwegian government has operated an influenza surveillance system for many years. In this system, 201 selected general practices throughout the country report weekly the percentage of patients given a diagnosis of influenza. The study covers about 15% of the population. The results of the influenza study during the 2009 flu pandemic in Norway are shown in the figure below. The share of doctor contacts that ended in a diagnosis of influenza-like illness shot up to nearly 10% in week 44. The last time this percentage was this high was in the 1999-2000 flu season.

On the basis of the last reported data, as of November 4, 2009, the Norwegian Public Health Institute concluded "the pandemic influenza virus is spreading epidemically in large parts of the country".

Deaths

Scenarios 
It was reported that 30% of the population would likely fall ill within six months, and that half of those would be confined to their beds. Ultimately, one out of every two persons would have acquired the disease at some point. This meant that about 700,000 Norwegians would have fallen ill, and in this period, 700 to 3,000 more deaths than a regular influenza season were to be expected.

The worst-case scenario was reported to be that 50% of the population would fall ill within six months, and half of those would be confined to their beds. In this case, 1.2 million Norwegians would have fallen ill in this period and an extra 5,000–13,000 deaths beyond the regular influenza season were expected.

Preparations 
Norway had a stockpile of 1.4 million doses of Tamiflu and had ordered 200,000 doses of Relenza.

The Norwegian Institute of Public Health (FHI) announced that it would be only a matter of time before the virus was transmitted within Norway, and that cases of travelers falling ill should be expected within the next few weeks. The main goal was to quickly reduce the spread of the virus in Norway, even so, the closure of public institutions, such as schools and kindergartens, was to be avoided as long as possible.

As of May 15, the Norwegian government lifted their advisory against travel to Mexico, even so, people with increased risk of infection were advised to reconsider the need to travel.

In early May, Norway pre-ordered 4.7 million doses of the then not-yet-developed Swine Influenza vaccine. The price was estimated to be $47.5 million.  Regarding the order, Health Care Minister Bjarne Håkon Hanssen said

The contract we are entering into will make it possible to secure vaccine for the population before a pandemic is declared. For myself and for the government it is important to follow up on the advice from the Pandemic Committee...  This is also in line with professional advice from the health institutions.

Vaccine 
As of the fall of 2009, Norway was supplied with 9.4 million doses of the influenza vaccine from GlaxoSmithKline; every Norwegian could be given up to two doses. The vaccine was intended to be ready for use after clinical trials in November or December, however, because swine influenza still was considered to be a mild disease, the influenza vaccine could not be used without approval by the European Medicines Agency (EMEA).

Distribution 
Norway had enough vaccine for every citizen by the fall of 2009. Health personnel, as well as people with an increased risk of complications, were advised to receive early vaccinations. The Healthcare Ministry provided recommendations for which groups to prioritize in vaccination distribution.

Outbreak 

The Norwegian Institute of Public Health (FHI) updated their homepage with information about the swine flu outbreak in Norway every day at 10:00 (UTC). FHI believed that the northern hemisphere would not be greatly affected by the virus, with the exception of a few outbreaks in enclosed places (schools and other institutions, cruise ships), followed by a bigger epidemic in the fall or winter.

On May 9, two Norwegian students from Oslo and Telemark, were confirmed to be infected with swine flu after they came home from studying in Mexico. Neither of them became seriously ill and they recovered quickly. These were the first two cases of swine influenza in Norway.

On May 19, a Norwegian woman from Oslo was confirmed to be infected with swine flu after coming home from the United States. This was the third confirmed case of swine influenza in Norway.

On May 20, a Norwegian man from Vest-Agder was confirmed to be infected with swine influenza after returning from a trip to the United States. This was the fourth confirmed case of swine influenza in Norway.

On May 27, a Norwegian man was confirmed to be infected with swine influenza in Düsseldorf, Germany. The man was put in isolation where he stayed for 10 days. He showed obvious symptoms of influenza on the flight from the United States to Germany, and when he exited the plane, he was met by four doctors. His trip home to Norway was delayed. This case, however, is not reported as a Norwegian case of swine influenza, but a German one.

On May 29, a Norwegian woman from Oslo was confirmed to be infected with swine influenza after returning from a trip to the United States. She was the fifth confirmed case in Norway.

On May 30, two Norwegians were confirmed to be infected with swine influenza. One of them was a woman from Rogaland returning from Mexico; the other one was a woman from Oslo returning from the United States. These were the sixth and seventh confirmed swine influenza cases in Norway.

On June 3, a Norwegian woman coming home from the United States was confirmed to be infected with swine influenza. This is the eighth confirmed case of swine influenza.

On June 4, a Norwegian woman from Vest-Agder who recently had been to the United States was confirmed to be infected with swine influenza. This was the ninth confirmed case of swine influenza.

On June 9, two Norwegian men from Vest-Agder and Oslo who recently had been to the United States were confirmed to be infected with swine influenza. These were the 10th and 11th cases of swine influenza in Norway.

On June 10, a Norwegian man from Vest-Agder was confirmed to be infected with swine influenza. Although he had not been infected abroad, he had been living with a person who had been infected abroad. This was the first domestic infection and was the 12th case of swine influenza in Norway.

On June 11, a Norwegian man from Oslo was confirmed to be infected with swine influenza. He had not recently been traveling abroad. This was the second domestic infection and the 13th case of swine influenza in Norway.

On June 12, a Norwegian man from Buskerud was confirmed to be infected with swine influenza. He had not been traveling abroad but was working with an infected person. This was the third domestic infection and 14th case of swine influenza in Norway.

On June 13, a Norwegian woman from Rogaland was confirmed to be infected with swine influenza. She had recently been to the United States and was infected there. This was the 15th case of swine influenza in Norway.

On June 15, a Norwegian man from Sør-Trøndelag was confirmed to be infected with swine influenza. He had recently been on a trip to the United States. This was the 16th case of swine influenza in Norway and first case of swine influenza in Sør-Trøndelag.

On June 17, a Norwegian man from Akershus was confirmed to be infected with swine influenza. He had recently been to the United States. This was the 17th case of swine influenza in Norway.

On June 18, a Norwegian man from Rogaland and two women from Akershus were confirmed to be infected with swine influenza. They had all recently been in the United States and were the 18th, 19th, and 20th cases of swine influenza in Norway.

On June 23, a Norwegian woman from Oslo and a Norwegian woman from Østfold were confirmed to be infected with swine influenza. They had recently been in the United States and were the 21st and 22nd cases of swine influenza in Norway.

On June 24, a Norwegian woman from Oslo was confirmed to be infected with swine influenza. She had recently been in England and was the 23rd case of swine influenza in Norway.

On June 25, a Norwegian man from Oslo was confirmed to be infected with swine influenza. He had recently been in Argentina and was the 24th case of swine influenza in Norway.

On June 26, a Norwegian woman from Sogn og Fjordane was confirmed to be infected with swine influenza. She had recently been in Greece and was the 25th case of swine influenza in Norway.

On June 29, a Norwegian woman from Hordaland was confirmed to be infected with swine influenza. She had recently been in the United States and was the 26th case of swine influenza in Norway.

On June 30, four Norwegian women (one from Oslo, one from Østfold and two from Sør-Trøndelag), two Norwegian men (one from Oslo and one from Sør-Trøndelag), and a Norwegian boy from Østfold were confirmed to be infected with swine influenza. They had all been traveling abroad; five of them had recently been in the United States, and the other two had recently been in Argentina. These were the 27th, 28th, 29th, 30th, 31st, 32nd and 33rd cases of swine influenza in Norway.

On July 1, seven Norwegians were confirmed to be infected with swine influenza. They were passengers on a cruise ship that had docked in Oslo. The sick passengers had not gone ashore and did not infect any persons on land. These cases were not counted as Norwegian cases and were therefore not included in the Norwegian total.

On July 2, a Norwegian woman from Bergen was confirmed to be infected with swine influenza. She had recently been in the United States. This was the 34th case of swine influenza in Norway.

On September 3, the first confirmed death caused by swine flu in Norway was reported.

On September 10, the third death was reported.

On October 19, the seventh death was confirmed in Bergen in a previously healthy male who was in his 50s.

On October 20, an alarming increase in absences caused by flu was reported at primary schools in Oslo and Bergen. In one school, over half of the elementary school students were absent because of the flu.

On October 20, the eighth death from the flu was confirmed as a woman in her twenties in Akershus county.

On October 22, the city of Bergen started widespread vaccination and a long queue of persons was reported.

On October 22, the ninth death from the flu was confirmed as a woman in her fifties in Akershus county.

On October 23, the 10th death from the flu was confirmed as a two-year-old child in Vest-Agder county.

On October 26, the 11th death from the flu was confirmed as a nine-year-old child in Oslo.

On October 28, the 12th and 13 deaths from the flu were reported.

On October 30, the 14th death from flu was confirmed. A woman in her forties from Ringsaker died at the hospital in Hamar.

On November 2, the 15th death from flu was announced. A  woman less than 20 years of age from Hedmark county died November 1 at Rikshospitalet.

Notes 

Norway
2009 in Norway
2010 in Norway
2009 disasters in Norway
2010 disasters in Norway
Health disasters in Norway